Mansa may refer to:

Places

In India 
 Mansa, Gujarat, a town in northern Gujarat, Western India; the capital of:
 Mansa, Gujarat Assembly constituency
 Mansa State, a princely state under the Mahi Kantha Agency in India
 Mansa district, Punjab
 Mansa, Punjab, the main town in the Indian district

Elsewhere 
 Mansa District, Zambia, a district of Luapula province, Zambia
 Mansa, Zambia, capital of the Luapula province
 Mansa Cove, Antarctica
 Barra Mansa, Brazil

Religion 
 Manasa Devi, a Hindu goddess, an incarnation of the goddess Durga
 Mata Mansa Devi Mandir, a temple in Panchkula district, Haryana, India
 Mansa Devi Temple, Haridwar, a temple in the state of Uttarakhand, India
 Roman Catholic Diocese of Mansa, Zambia

People 
 Johan Ludvig Mansa (1740–1820), German-Danish landscape gardener
 Mansa Devi, wife of Guru Amar Das (1479–1574), the third Sikh Guru
 Mansa Ram, Indian politician

Other uses 
 MANSA, a quality-of-life assessment tool
 Mansa (title), held by rulers of the ancient Malian Empire
 Mansa (wasp), a genus of wasps in the tribe Aptesini

See also
 Mansar (disambiguation)